Bryan Djile Nokoue (born 23 May 2002) is a Cameroonian professional footballer who plays as a defender for  club Saint-Étienne.

Club career 
Bryan Nokoue was born in Yaoundé, Cameroon, and came through the ranks of Montrouge FC in the Île-de-France before joining Saint-Étienne academy in 2018. In August 2021, as several other clubs where looking to attract the young footballer, he eventually signed his first professional contract with Saint-Étienne. He made his professional debut for Saint-Étienne on the 15 August 2021, replacing Yvan Neyou during a 2–2 Ligue 1 away draw against Lens.

References

External links

AS Saint-Étienne profile

2002 births
Living people
Cameroonian footballers
Association football defenders
Cameroon youth international footballers
Footballers from Yaoundé
AS Saint-Étienne players
Ligue 1 players
Cameroonian expatriate footballers
Expatriate footballers in Cameroon
Cameroonian expatriate sportspeople in France